The Ex is a 2006 American comedy film directed by Jesse Peretz and starring Zach Braff, Amanda Peet and Jason Bateman. The film had a wide release planned for January 19, 2007, and then March 9, 2007. It was originally promoted under the working title Fast Track. It was released on May 11, 2007. Co-stars include Charles Grodin, in his first film appearance since 1994, Donal Logue and Mia Farrow.

The film generally received negative reviews from critics. It had a gross of $5,178,640.

Plot
Living in Manhattan, Tom is a cook who has difficulty keeping a steady job. His wife, Sofia, is an attorney. When their first child is born, they agree that she will be a full-time mom and he will work hard to get promoted.

When Tom gets fired after defending his friend Paco, he takes a job in Ohio working at the ad agency where his father-in-law is the assistant director. Assigned to report to Chip, who is a strict and hard-working paraplegic and Sofia's ex-boyfriend from high school. Chip is still obsessed with her, so he conspires to make Tom's work life miserable. As Tom's frustrations mount, he seems to sway Sofia to his side.

Tom begins to suspect that Chip isn't handicapped at all and goes through his desk. He finds a photo of him playing tennis and rushes to his in-laws' house to see his wife and show her the picture. He finds Chip having dinner with Sofia and her parents and holding his child. Tom tries to prove that Chip isn't actually paralyzed by dragging him up a flight of stairs and then throws him, expecting him to stand up to prevent falling.

Chip doesn't stand up (the photo actually being his late twin brother) and Tom is humiliated in front of his family. Later, he confronts and attacks him, where Chip reveals that he really can walk, but can't fight outside of his chair. Sitting back down, Chip beats him severely and revealing he plans to sleep with Sofia, to Tom's increased rage.

It's revealed that Paco had called Chip under the guise of being an ad agency boss in Barcelona, telling him he got a job and convincing him to fly to Spain. Excited by the news, Chip goes to Sofia and asks her to come with him. However, Tom accosts them both and convinces her not to go with him. Chip, angry that Sofia chose Tom over him, heartlessly mocks him, saying he "faked his orgasm" to Sofia before getting out of his chair and walking out.

While chastising them from outside, Chip is hit by a bus and ends up paralyzed from the waist down, crippling him for real. Tom and Sofia have moved out of Ohio and her dad is helping him start his own ad business. Now, the couple have switched positions, Tom becoming a stay-at-home dad while Sofia becomes a full-time lawyer again. During the credits Chip is shown being tossed out of the ad company in Spain, and later on Tom's friend sees Chip in the middle of the running of the bulls on TV.

Cast
 Zach Braff as Tom Reilly
 Amanda Peet as Sofia Kowalski-Reilly
 Jason Bateman as Chip Sanders
 Charles Grodin as Bob Kowalski
 Mia Farrow as Amelia Kowalski
 Lucian Maisel as Wesley
 Amy Poehler as Carol Lane
 Paul Rudd as Leon
 Fred Armisen as Manny
 Donal Logue as Don Wollebin
 Amy Adams as Abby March
 Josh Charles as Forrest Mead
 Marin Hinkle as Karen
 Romany Malco as Hakeem Oliver
 Yul Vazquez as Paco

Critical response
On Rotten Tomatoes, the film holds a 19% approval rating based on 101 reviews with an average rating of 4.34/10. The site's consensus states: "The Ex suffers from inept direction and characters that are either unsympathetic or plain unpleasant to watch." By comparison, Metacritic, which assigns a normalized rating out of 100 top reviews from mainstream critics, calculated an average score of 32, based on 24 reviews.

Several film critics said the film felt truncated. Lou Lumenick of the New York Post said the film "seems arbitrarily edited to squeeze in extra screenings before it's killed by word-of-mouth." Film critics also felt that the majority of the cast's talents were wasted. Many film critics also compared the film to a sitcom. Pam Grady of Reel.com said the film "never rises above the level of a TV show grotesquely inflated for the big screen."

Jesse Peretz was criticized for his direction by many critics. Phoebe Flowers of the South Florida Sun-Sentinel said the film was "directed with a breathtaking lack of instinct by Jesse Peretz." A few critics described the film as half-baked. Sean Means of The Salt Lake Tribune said "It's like undercooked lasagna: lots of layers, but the flavors never blend." Bill Muller of The Arizona Republic said the film was Zach Braff's most average movie so far. Steven Rea of The Philadelphia Inquirer said that after The Last Kiss and Garden State, "Braff's shtick...is getting tired." Desson Thomson of The Washington Post said the film "marks an all-time low for actor Zach Braff -- his Gigli, if you will.."

The screenwriters, David Guion and Michael Handelman, virtually disowned the finished film. Handelman said, "I think what we wrote was meant to be a bit less broad than the film that came out. I think a lot of what you see in either of those films is stuff that was not written by us even though we’re the only credited writers on that." Guion added, "That movie was a bit of a cautionary story for screenwriters in terms of that it was a movie that struggled a little bit and didn’t test well initially, and the financers panicked and said, 'We better show a lot of people getting hit in the balls'...  It was unfortunate because the director, Jesse Peretz, is great and very talented, but the movie was ultimately taken out of his hands."

Zach Braff and Jason Bateman were praised for their performances by several critics. Roger Moore of the Orlando Sentinel said "Braff and Bateman make this patchwork just funny enough to be worth our trouble." Jason Bateman was praised by several film critics as being the best part of the movie. David Nusair of Reel Film Reviews said "there's little doubt that Bateman deserves the lion's share of praise thanks to his scene-stealing work as Tom's hilariously smug nemesis."

Box office performance
The film opened at #12 at the U.S. box office, earning $1.4 million in 1,009 theaters in its opening weekend. The film went on to gross $3,093,394 in its nine-week theatrical run in the United States. In other territories, the film grossed $2,085,246 making its total worldwide gross $5,178,640.

References

External links
 
 
 
 
 

2006 films
2006 comedy films
American comedy films
Films produced by Anne Carey
Films scored by Edward Shearmur
Films directed by Jesse Peretz
Metro-Goldwyn-Mayer films
The Weinstein Company films
2000s English-language films
2000s American films